Vijayanagar is a small village located in the Belgaum district, Karnataka state in southern India.  It is located a few kilometres south of Kabbur.

References

External links
 Map of Vijayanagar, Belgaum, Karnataka, India
 Belgaum district site

Villages in Belagavi district